Chemawa may refer to one of these United States subjects:

The Chemawa band of the Kalapuya tribe of Native Americans
Chemawa, Oregon, a former community now part of Salem, Oregon
Chemawa Indian School, a Native American boarding school in Oregon
Chemawa Middle School, a school in the Riverside Unified School District in California